Smethport Area School District is a rural, public school district located in McKean County, Pennsylvania, United States.  Situated in the north central part of the state, it overlooks the borough of Smethport, which serves as the county seat. 

Smethport Area School District serves the residents of: Hamlin Township, Keating Township, Norwich Township and Sergeant Township. According to 2000 federal census data, it serves a resident population of 6,399. By 2010, the district's population declined to 6,121 people. In 2009, the district residents’ per capita income was $15,819, while the median family income was $39,809. In the Commonwealth, the median family income was $49,501  and the United States median family income was $49,445, in 2010. Smethport Area School District has its entire complex in the borough of Smethport. Smethport Area School District operates one elementary school for grades K–6. It is connected by tunnel to the Smethport Area Junior Senior High School, which houses grades 7–12. The superintendent's offices are in the elementary school.

District athletics and activities
The district offers a variety of clubs, activities and an extensive sports program.

The school mascot is a wagon wheel, and they go by the name of "The Hubbers."  The word "hubber" is symbolic of a wheel's hub—or center.  The reason this is their name is because Smethport is the county seat—or the "hub" (center) of McKean County.

Activities students may participate in are: band, choir, National Honor Society, French and German clubs, Spanish and student council

Sports
The District funds:

Boys
Baseball - A
Basketball- A
Cross Country - A
Football - A
Golf - AA
Soccer - A
Track and Field - AA
Wrestling	 - AA

Girls
Basketball - A
Cross Country - A
Golf - AA
Soccer (Fall) - A
Softball - A
Track and Field - AA
Volleyball - A

Junior High School Sports

Boys
Basketball
Cross Country
Football
Track and Field
Wrestling	

Girls
Basketball
Cross Country
Track and Field
Volleyball 

According to PIAA directory July 2012

References

Some information for this article is taken from the school district's website or is contributed by employees of the school and/or citizen's of Smethport Borough

External links

Seneca Highlands Intermediate Unit

School districts in McKean County, Pennsylvania
Smethport, Pennsylvania